The Rockwell-Messerschmitt-Bölkow-Blohm X-31 was an experimental jet fighter designed to test fighter thrust vectoring technology.

It was designed and built by Rockwell and Messerschmitt-Bölkow-Blohm (MBB), as part of a joint US and German Enhanced Fighter Maneuverability program to provide additional control authority in pitch and yaw, for significantly more maneuverability than most conventional fighters. An advanced flight control system provided controlled flight at high angles of attack where conventional aircraft would stall or lose control. Two aircraft were built, of which only one has survived.

Design and development 
The X-31 design was essentially an all-new airframe design, although it borrowed heavily on design elements and sometimes actual parts of previous production, prototype, and conceptual aircraft designs, including the British Aerospace Experimental Airplane Programme (choice of wing type with canards, plus underfuselage intake), the German TKF-90 (wing planform concepts and underfuselage intake), F/A-18 Hornet (forebody, including cockpit, ejection seat, and canopy; electrical generators), F-16 Fighting Falcon (landing gear, fuel pump, rudder pedals, nosewheel tires, and emergency power unit), F-16XL (leading-edge flap drives), V-22 Osprey (control surface actuators), Cessna Citation (main landing gear's wheels and brakes), F-20 Tigershark (hydrazine emergency air-start system, later replaced) and B-1 Lancer (spindles from its control vanes used for the canards). This was done on purpose, so that development time and risk would be reduced by using flight-qualified components. To reduce the cost of tooling for a production run of only two aircraft, Rockwell developed the "fly-away tooling" concept (perhaps the most successful spinoff of the program), whereby 15 fuselage frames were manufactured via CNC, tied together with a holding fixture, and attached to the factory floor with survey equipment. That assembly then became the tooling for the plane, which was built around it, thus "flying away" with its own tooling.

Two X-31s were built, with the first flying on October 11, 1990. Over 500 test flights were carried out between 1990 and 1995. The X-31 is a canard delta, a delta wing aircraft which uses canard foreplanes for primary pitch control, with secondary thrust-vectoring control. The canard delta had earlier been used on the Saab Viggen strike fighter, and has since become common on fighters such as the Eurofighter Typhoon, Dassault Rafale and Gripen which were all designed and flew several years before the X-31. The X-31 featured a cranked-delta wing (similar to the Saab 35 Draken and the F-16XL prototype), and fixed strakes along the aft fuselage, as well as a pair of movable computer-controlled canards to increase stability and maneuverability. There are no moveable horizontal tail surfaces, only the vertical fin with rudder. Pitch and roll are controlled by the canard with the aid of the three paddles directing the exhaust (thrust vectoring). Eventually, simulations and flight tests on one of the X-31s showed that flight would be stable without the vertical fin, because the thrust-vectoring nozzle provided sufficient yaw and pitch control.

During flight testing, the X-31 aircraft established several milestones. On November 6, 1992, the X-31 achieved controlled flight at a 70° angle of attack. On April 29, 1993, the second X-31 successfully executed a rapid minimum-radius, 180° turn using a post-stall maneuver, flying well outside the range of angle of attack normal for conventional aircraft. This maneuver has been called the "Herbst maneuver" after Dr. Wolfgang Herbst, an MBB employee and proponent of using post-stall flight in air-to-air combat. Herbst was the designer of the Rockwell SNAKE, which formed the basis for the X-31.

In the mid-1990s, the program began to revitalize and so the US and Germany signed a Memorandum of Understanding in April 1999 to start collaboration on the $53 million VECTOR program to capitalize on this previous investment. VECTOR is a joint venture that includes the US Navy, Germany's defense procurement agency BWB, Boeing's Phantom Works, and DASA; it was initially expected to involve Sweden, which pulled out due to fiscal constraints. As the site for the flight testing, Naval Air Station Patuxent River in Maryland was chosen. The program then culminated in the first ever autonomous landing of a manned aircraft with high angle of attack (24 degree) and short landing. The technologies involved a differential GPS System based on pseudolite technology from Integrinautics and a miniaturized flush air data system from Nordmicro.

Serial numbers 
 BuNo 164584, 292 flights – crashed on January 19, 1995, north of Edwards AFB, California. The crash was caused by ice inside the pitot tube, sending incorrect airspeed data to the flight control computers. Contributing factors included the replacement of a heated pitot tube with an unheated Kiel probe, and ground crew/pilot ignorance of an option to override computer control. The pilot ejected safely. NASA issued in 2005 a film, "X-31: Breaking the Chain," reviewing the events. The novelty of the X-31 trials was computer control of its revolutionary flight controls (the canard wing and engine baffles) to effect maneuvers impossible for conventional jet fighters. The film discusses at length the combination of independent errors (e.g. that the accompanying chase pilot could not hear the test pilot's radio conversation with his base) in prompting loss of control, when the test pilot (correctly) ejected to save his life. Film of the crash shows the aircraft in unusual attitudes as the computer applied its false data to attempt to control flight after the pilot ejected.
 BuNo 164585, 288 flights, the last one being in 2003. Put on Permanent Display at Deutsches Museum Flugwerft Schleissheim in Germany''.

Specifications (X-31)

See also

Gallery

References

Bibliography 
 
 Jenkins, Dennis R., Tony Landis, and Jay Miller. SP-2003-4531, "American X-Vehicles, An Inventory—X-1 to X-50". NASA, June 2003.
 
 USAF & NATO Report RTO-TR-015 AC/323/(HFM-015)/TP-1 (2001)

External links 

 NASA Dryden: X-31
 James Schombert's X-Plane history
 NASA X-31 image gallery
 Flap Splitting and Setting of the X-31 Wing
 "X-31: Breaking the Chain" video of crash and investigation

Canard aircraft
Edwards Air Force Base
X-31
NASA aircraft
X-31
X-31, Rockwell-MBB
Delta-wing aircraft
Single-engined jet aircraft
Articles containing video clips
Aircraft first flown in 1990
1990s German experimental aircraft
Three dimension thrust vectoring aircraft
1990s international aircraft
Germany–United States military relations